The 1906 Kansas gubernatorial election was held on November 6, 1906. Incumbent Republican Edward W. Hoch defeated Democratic nominee William Alexander Harris with 48.24% of the vote.

General election

Candidates
Major party candidates 
Edward W. Hoch, Republican
William Alexander Harris, Democratic

Other candidates
J. B. Cook, Prohibition
Harry Gilham, Socialist
Horace A. Keefer, People's

Results

References

1906
Kansas
Gubernatorial